Yagori (Yaguri) is a town in the eastern Sool Region of Somalia/Somalia.

Recent history
In January 1991, a peace conference was held in Yagori under the leadership of the Somali National Movement (later the government of Somaliland), and Habr Je'lo, Habar Yoonis, and Dhulbahante clans participated.

In July 2002, the Somaliland army deployed 450 troops in Yagori. The governor of Puntland's Sool region, who was in Las Anod at the time, condemned the move, saying it would split the Harti clan.

In 2005, elections were held in Somaliland, in Yagori town, which is controlled by the Somaliland Armed Forces, but even within Yagori district there were places where elections were not held.

In August 2016, President Silanyo visited Yagori.

In April 2019, a prison commander and a deputy commander of a police station of Somaliland were murdered in Yagori.
In December 2021, a peace conference between Jaamac Siyaad and Ugaadhyahan, both branches of Dhulbahante, took place in Yagori. The Somaliland Minister of Interior was present at the conference.

Demographics

A book published in 1951 states that the clans that was grazing livestock in Yagori were Yesif, Adan Madoba, Idleh Farah of Habr Je'lo, and Yahia, Ahmed Gerad, Jama Siad, and rer Elmi of Dhulbahante.

The adjacent Afbakayle locals were raided by Eric Swayne and these were said to be Jama Siad livestock in 1901:

The city is now primarily inhabited by the Jama Siad sub-clan, with the Reer Warsame well represented, as well as the Elmi Naleye "Reer Cilmi" sub-lineage of the Naleye Ahmed.

Yagori was during the colonial era a part of Nogal District, described by John Hunt as an "entirely Dolbahanta" district.

See also

Administrative divisions of Somaliland
Regions of Somaliland
Districts of Somaliland
Somalia–Somaliland border

References

Populated places in Sool, Somaliland
Districts of Somaliland